The Syracuse Northern Railroad, incorporated in 1868 and opened on November 9, 1871, drew trade from Liverpool to Syracuse, New York. The line had routes to Watertown, New York, and in 1875, the road was extended to Pulaski and Lacona.

The company merged in 1875 into Syracuse and Northern Railroad and once again that same year to Rome, Watertown and Ogdensburg Railroad.

References

Predecessors of the New York Central Railroad
Railway companies established in 1868
Railway companies disestablished in 1875
Defunct New York (state) railroads
Defunct railroads in Syracuse, New York